Yepifan I Kovtyukh (May 21, 1890 – July 29, 1938) was a Soviet corps commander. He was born in modern-day Ukraine. He fought in the Imperial Russian Army in World War I before going over to the Bolsheviks. He was a recipient of the Cross of St. George and the Order of the Red Banner. He commanded the 11th Rifle Corps from January 1930 to June 1936. During the Great Purge, he was arrested by the NKVD on August 10, 1937 and his name appeared on Stalin's execution list of July 26, 1938. He was executed three days later. After the death of Joseph Stalin, he was rehabilitated on February 23, 1956. With Stephan Vostretsov, he is remembered on a plaque at Ataman House (Novocherkassk).

References

1890 births
1938 deaths
Soviet komkors
Russian military personnel of World War I
Soviet military personnel of the Russian Civil War
Recipients of the Cross of St. George
Recipients of the Order of the Red Banner
Great Purge victims from Ukraine
People executed by the Soviet Union
Soviet rehabilitations
Frunze Military Academy alumni